Brzeźnicka Węgorza  is a river in gmina Węgorzyno, West Pomeranian Voivodeship, Poland. It is a tributary of Rega, being long for about 40 km. Its beginnings can be found in the Studnica lake, in Drawa river region. It flows into Rega near Łobez.

Brzeźnicka Węgorza is extremely diverse along its current. In the upper current it resembles a mountain stream. The lower current (down the Żabice lake) is rather slow, the river flows in a wide valley, along riparian forests with ash trees and alders.

Rivers of Poland
Rivers of West Pomeranian Voivodeship